Saundatti Yellamma, also spelt Savadatti, is one of 224 assembly constituencies in Karnataka state, in India. It is one of the 8 constituencies which make up Belagavi (Lok Sabha constituency). The constituency came into existence when the assembly map was redrawn in 2008. Prior to that most of its area was under the now defunct Parasgad.

Anand Chandrashekhar Mamani (alias Vishwanath Mamani) won this seat in 2018 election. Chandrashekhar Mamani, Anand's father, was elected to Assembly as Janata Dal candidate from Parasgad in 1994. Anand Mamani was elected Deputy Speaker of Karnataka Assembly in March 2020.

Members of Assembly
 1967-2004 : See Parasgad Assembly constituency
 2008: Anand Mamani (alias Vishwanath Chandrashekhar Mamani), Bharatiya Janata Party
 2013: Anand Mamani , Bharatiya Janata Party
 2018: Anand Mamani , Bharatiya Janata Party

See also 
 Belagavi District
 List of constituencies of Karnataka Legislative Assembly

References

Assembly constituencies of Karnataka